Chynna Gilliam Phillips (born February 12, 1968) is an American singer and actress, and a member of the vocal group Wilson Phillips. She is the daughter of the Mamas & the Papas band members John and Michelle Phillips and half-sister of Mackenzie and Bijou Phillips.

Early life and film work
Phillips began her career in acting. She appeared in films such as Some Kind of Wonderful, Caddyshack II, Say Anything and as the title character Roxanne Pulitzer in the 1989 television biographical film, Roxanne: The Prize Pulitzer. In 1995, she appeared as Kim MacAfee in the television movie Bye Bye Birdie. Phillips voiced the character of Kitty along with her husband William Baldwin as Johnny 13 in Danny Phantom episodes "13" (2004), "Lucky in Love" (2005) and "Girl's Night Out"(2007).

Phillips was a contestant on the thirteenth season of Dancing with the Stars. Her professional partner was two-time finalist Tony Dovolani.

Music career
In the late 1980s, Phillips formed the trio Wilson Phillips with her childhood friends Carnie and Wendy Wilson. The group released their self-titled debut album in 1990. The album would go on to sell eight million copies. The group's second album, Shadows and Light, released in 1992, was a commercial disappointment, despite being certified platinum.

In 1995, Phillips released her debut solo album, Naked and Sacred, but failed to recapture the success she found with Wilson Phillips. In 2004, Wilson Phillips reunited to record their third album, California, which featured cover tunes from West Coast singers from the 1960s/70s.

In the October 15, 2007, issue of People magazine, she was said to be writing songs for a Christian album. She appeared in brother-in-law Stephen Baldwin's documentary, Livin It: Unusual Suspects. In 2009, Phillips teamed up with singer/songwriter Vaughan Penn to form the duo "Chynna and Vaughan". The two released their debut album, One Reason, on September 22, 2009. Wilson Phillips released 'Christmas In Harmony' in 2010 and 'Dedicated' in 2012. They continue to play shows every year.

In July 2016, Wilson Phillips reunited and performed on ABC's Greatest Hits.

Personal life
Phillips had a drug and alcohol addiction as a teenager.

Phillips met actor William Baldwin of the acting Baldwin family in 1991 and has been married to him since 1995. Together, they have three children, daughters Jameson (born in 2000) and Brooke (born in 2004) and son Vance (born in 2001).

In September 2009 Chynna's half-sister, Mackenzie Phillips, alleged in her memoirs that she [Mackenzie] and her father had a "consensual" ten-year incestuous relationship. While both Geneviève Waïte (John's wife at the time, and mother of Bijou Phillips), and Michelle Phillips, John's second wife (mother of Chynna Phillips) told the media that they did not believe her claims, Chynna said she believed Mackenzie.

On February 12, 2010, Phillips was treated for anxiety. In a statement made on February 27, her manager Lizzie Grubman said, "After successfully completing her in-patient treatment for anxiety, Chynna Phillips has happily returned home to celebrate her daughter's birthday with her family." Grubman said Phillips was "happy to be home with her family. She is in great spirits."

Phillips is a born-again Christian.

Filmography

Film

Television

Dancing with the Stars performances
Chynna Phillip's partner was Tony Dovolani.

Discography

Albums

Singles

References

External links

American women pop singers
American film actresses
American television actresses
Living people
Singers from Los Angeles
Actresses from Los Angeles
Wilson Phillips members
SBK Records artists
EMI Records artists
Christians from California
Baldwin acting family
Phillips family
1968 births